O1 is the second studio album by Son of Dave. It was released in 2000 on Kartel Records.

Track listing

External links
Review by Benoît Felten at Planet Harmonica

2000 albums
Son of Dave albums